Paul Gangelin (November 7, 1898 – September 25, 1961) was an American screenwriter.

Selected filmography
 Breed of the Border (1924)
 The No-Gun Man (1924)
 Forever After (1926)
 The Racketeer (1929)
 The Office Scandal (1929)
 The Black Mask (1935)
 Street Song (1935)
 Too Dangerous to Live (1939)
 Tarzan's Secret Treasure (1941)
 The Boogie Man Will Get You (1942)
 The Scarlet Claw (1944)
 A Sporting Chance (1945)
 The Daltons Ride Again (1945)
 Bells of San Angelo (1947)
 Under California Stars (1948)

References

Bibliography
 Len D. Martin. The Republic Pictures Checklist: Features, Serials, Cartoons, Short Subjects and Training Films of Republic Pictures Corporation, 1935-1959. McFarland, 1998.

External links

1898 births
1961 deaths
20th-century American screenwriters
Screenwriters from Wisconsin
Writers from Milwaukee